The 1879 NYU Violets football team was an American football team that represented New York University in the 1879 college football season. The team played three games, losing to Stevens Institute of Technology twice and tying them once.

Schedule

References

NYU
NYU Violets football seasons
College football winless seasons
NYU Violets football